The Murunitja are an indigenous Australian tribe of Western Australia located within the Goldfields-Esperance region.

Name
The ethnonym Murunitja appears to derive for a word murun, meaning a "stout person", referring to the characteristic build of the tribe.

Language
The Murunitja language is closely related to Mirnung and Ngadjunmaya

Country
They also ranged as far as Rawlinna and the Walawuluna Rockhole.

Alternative names
 Mooroon.
 Murnidja.
 Mara. (?)
 Kogara. ('east')

Notes

Citations

Sources

Aboriginal peoples of Western Australia
Goldfields-Esperance